The Taipei Marathon is an annual marathon held in Taipei, Taiwan, on the third weekend in December. The event has an Elite Label from World Athletics and has been held annually since 1986. It is the preeminent long-distance annual running event in Taiwan.

It ranks among Taiwan's top four marathon events, alongside the New Taipei City Wan Jin Shi Marathon, the Taiwan's Rice Heaven Tianzhong Marathon, and the Kaohsiung Fubon Marathon.

History 
On December 22, 1985, the Chinese Taipei Athletics Association organized a road running demonstration event that served as a warm-up for the first Taipei International Marathon.

The first Taipei International Marathon begins on March 9, 1986, with over 2,000 participants, including elite athletes from seven nations, running through the streets of Taipei. All of the starting and finishing points are on Ketagalan Boulevard.

The Taipei International Marathon ran until 1989, when it was forced to halt due to the construction of the Taipei Metro. It has spawned a new marathon race, held on National Freeway 3, which is currently closed to traffic. After the Taipei International Marathon resumed, the event was renamed "Taipei Freeway Marathon" and relocated to National Freeway 1.

Taipei International Marathon returns on November 14, 2001, with the starting and finishing points relocated to Taipei City Hall Square. The event was renamed "ING Taipei International Marathon" until 2008 after ING Aetna Insurance became the title sponsor in 2003.

Fubon Financial Holding Co. became the sponsor of the Taipei International Marathon in 2009. This year's race has 12,100 participants, the highest number in the event's history. The running route has also changed significantly, with the addition of a section of riverside park from Nangang to Songshan in 2011.

Race

Starting time

Course 

The marathon starts in front of Taipei City Hall and ends inside Taipei Stadium.

Runners then head north along Zhongshan Road, and cross the Keelung River. The marathon then roughly follows the river east until making a turnaround near the Nangang Exhibition Center, and then roughly follows the south side of the river back west to Yingfeng Dog Park. Afterward, the course heads south and then west, eventually joining up with Nanjing Road before finishing inside Taipei Stadium.

The half marathon also starts in front of City Hall, but ends on Nanjing Road before reaching the stadium.

See also 
 List of winners of the Taipei Marathon
 List of sporting events in Taiwan
 List of marathon races in Asia

Annotation

References

Recurring sporting events established in 2004
Marathons
Marathons
Marathons in Taiwan
Winter events in Taiwan